Beau Nunn (born June 12, 1995) is a former American football guard. He played college football for Appalachian State, where he started 41 of 43 games in his collegiate career and was First-team All Sun Belt Conference his senior season.

Professional career
Nunn signed for the Detroit Lions as an undrafted free agent on May 11, 2018. He was waived on July 27, 2018. He was re-signed on August 20, 2018, only to be waived nine days later.

On October 14, 2018, Nunn signed with the San Diego Fleet. The league ceased operations in April 2019.

References

External links
Appalachian State Mountaineers bio

Living people
1995 births
American football offensive guards
Appalachian State Mountaineers football players
Detroit Lions players
People from York, South Carolina
Players of American football from South Carolina
San Diego Fleet players